Anton Viacheslavovich Mamaev (born 24 May 1997) is a Russian competitive snowboarder. He competed as an Olympic Athlete from Russia at the 2018 Winter Olympics in the Men's big air, finishing 32nd overall and failing to advance out of the heats. Mamaev previously reached the semifinal in the big air at the 2017 World Championships.

References

Living people
1997 births
Snowboarders at the 2018 Winter Olympics
Russian male snowboarders
Olympic snowboarders of Russia
Universiade gold medalists for Russia
Universiade medalists in snowboarding
Competitors at the 2019 Winter Universiade
21st-century Russian people